The Pesalai church attack occurred on June 17, 2006 when armed gunmen shot at houses as well as Our lady of heart church in Pesalai, a village in Mannar Island, Sri Lanka. Six civilians were killed and at least 47 were injured in the attack. The eyewitness accused the governmental troops for this attack. The Sri Lankan Navy has denied this and has counter accused the rebel LTTE as being the responsible party. Government of Sri Lanka instituted an investigation into this incident and has identified the responsible party.

Background
Mannar District is in the north-west of Sri Lanka and is one of the least developed districts in the country. It has a substantial Catholic and Muslim population. Pesalai has the largest Catholic community in the Mannar District. As it is a costal helmet, there had been many clashes between LTTE and Sri Lankan Navy there. Particularly on June 17, 2006 the Sri Lankan Navy and LTTE clashed in the sea during the early-morning. As a result, 30 people were said to be dead. Consequently, 200 people took shelter at the Our lady of victory church. These people took refuge in the church amid fear of the violence escalating. An earlier incident, where  the confrontation between LTTE and Sri Lankan Army destroyed many houses, also added to the fear of the people.

Attack on the Church
Survivors and witnesses of attack claimed that a group of armed men in
shorts and blue T-shirts shot indiscriminately at houses. Later some
more men came and shot at the church for about 10 minutes. Then the men
reportedly rolled two grenades into the church. One grenade hit a window and ricocheted back. To ensure that the second had more of an impact, an attacker put his hand through one window that had not been properly shut and rolled it along the ground into the most populated area of the Church. Finally,
they moved to the front of the church and shot before leaving. This
attack left 47 people injured.

Further attack
The survivors also claimed that the navy had walked down the village indiscriminately shooting at the houses. In addition to the damages to the houses, a further 40 boats and 45 wadiyas were destroyed in the incident, and people estimate that their losses will exceed 50 million rupees (₹50,000,000). The burning of the boats were a major problem to the village as most of the population relied on fishing for income. The attack on the surrounding villages left four more fishermen dead. All of them were shot through the mouth and killed on the beach. Remains of one more man was found in a burned boat. Many huts were also burned.

Reactions
The eyewitness of the attack has accused the Sri Lankan Navy and
was confirmed by an international aid worker. However, the Sri Lankan ministry first claimed that the church was caught in the middle of a firefight. Later, the defense ministry website  has denied this accusation and instead blamed the LTTE for this attack. The Sri Lankan ministry of defense website also accused the local Roman Catholic bishop Rayappu Joseph as pro-rebel. The president of the country instituted an
investigation into this incident. and the investigation identified the responsible parties.

Bishop Rayappu Joshep, in a letter to the Vatican, claimed that the Church "has been desecrated by innocent blood being shed [in it] by unjust aggressors, the Sri Lanka Navy". He further added "Today I buried the six civilians murdered by the Navy at Pesalai yesterday" Bishop Rauappu accused the navy for the disappearance of 4 people, including three-year-old child, on December 23, 2006. A priest from the diocese also claimed “From what I heard from reliable sources, the hand grenade lobbed inside the church was indeed thrown by a member of the navy.”

References

External links
Killing match in Lanka
Promoting Adherence to International Human Rights Standards

2006 crimes in Sri Lanka
Attacks on buildings and structures in Sri Lanka
Attacks on civilians attributed to the Sri Lanka Navy
Massacres in Sri Lanka
Massacres in religious buildings and structures
Mass murder in 2006
Mass murder of Sri Lankan Tamils
Sri Lankan government forces attacks in Eelam War IV
Terrorist incidents in Sri Lanka in 2006